Horrorscope may refer to:

Horrorscope (Eve 6 album)
Horrorscope (Overkill album)
HorrorScope (webzine), an Australian horror fiction news and review webzine
Horrorscope, an EP by Primal Fear
Horrorscope, a novel by Derek Lambert

See also
Horoscope